The 1959 Wellington City mayoral election was part of the New Zealand local elections held that same year. In 1959, elections were held for the Mayor of Wellington plus other local government positions including fifteen city councillors. The polling was conducted using the standard first-past-the-post electoral method.

Background
The right-leaning Citizens' Association ticket spent the three years since the last election resolving their candidate selection controversy with the intention of re-uniting themselves and their supporters to win back the mayoralty. Four people were nominated as the mayoral candidate with envelopes containing the names were passed to a fourteen member selection committee. At the meeting the committee Ernest Toop was once again chosen to contest the position. The other three names were not disclosed, but one of the speculated nominees (former mayor Thomas Hislop) confirmed his name was not among the nominations. Despite having a clean run this time he was unable to defeat Labour's popular Frank Kitts. The election also saw the debut of a new local body ticket. The Independent United Action Group stood ten council candidates under the leadership of Saul Goldsmith, though all polled poorly. It was the first time a separate ticket had been set up to challenge the long dominant Citizens' and Labour tickets.

While Kitts was re-elected, Labour's council ticket fared worse with its representation being halved from six seats to three. The overall anti-Labour vote (which was consistent nationwide) was attributed to the unpopularity of the then Labour government. Prime Minister Walter Nash commented simply "We seem to have held the mayoralties" in reference that in Wellington (as well as in Christchurch and Lower Hutt) Labour mayors were re-elected despite voters electing majority centre-right councils. In increasing his majority over twelve percent against the national trend newspapers lauded Kitts' win as a 'personal triumph'.

Mayoralty results

Councillor results

 
 
 
 
 
 
 
 
 
 
 
 
 
 
 
 
 
 
 
 
 
 
  
 
 
 
 
 
 
 
 
 

 

 
 
 

Table footnotes:

Notes

References

Mayoral elections in Wellington
1959 elections in New Zealand
Politics of the Wellington Region
1950s in Wellington
November 1959 events in New Zealand